Rabčice is a village and municipality in Námestovo District in the Žilina Region of northern Slovakia.

History
In historical records the village was first mentioned in 1616.

Geography
The municipality lies at an altitude of 756 metres and covers an area of 22.183 km². It has a population of about 1885 people.

Notable people
 Milan Jagnešák, Slovak bobsledder
 Milo Urban, Slovak writer

External links
http://www.statistics.sk/mosmis/eng/run.html

Villages and municipalities in Námestovo District